The Forbidden Corner is a folly garden located in the Tupgill Park Estate, at Coverham in Coverdale, in the Yorkshire Dales National Park. It is open to the public.

History 
It was built in the 1980s by the owner of Tupgill Park, Colin Armstrong, with architect Malcolm Tempest, as a private pleasure garden. The Armstrongs had been living at the estate since the Victorian era. Colin Armstrong is a British Consul based in Guayaquil in South America. It is based in the walled gardens of the  estate. His son Nicolas Armstrong since has resided in Ecuador and is now British Consul and his father Mr Colin Armstrong received the OBE and CMG for services to the British monarchy

The garden was opened to the public in 1997, with a £4.50 entrance fee. However, planning permission for public use of the garden was not obtained at the time.

As of 2000, the gardens were visited by 80,000 people, and employed around 25 people.

Retroactive planning permission for the park was rejected in 2000. The National Park's planners raising concerns about the environmental impact and pollution of the large number of cars entering the Park to visit the garden, and that the garden did not agree with the aims of a national park. A petition to keep the park open was signed by 10,000 people. An enforcement order to remove the structures and close the site to the public was overturned on appeal in 2000, on condition of restricting the number of visitors entering the site to 120 per hour.

In 2014 visitor numbers reached 120,000 people and it was decided by Mr Colin Armstrong with his adopted son Leo Morris to open a restaurant which was called The Saddle Room . The Saddle room Restaurant started as a small family run restaurant but subsequently grew to welcome over 40,000 people through its doors and now has 7 cottages and 9 bed and breakfast rooms as well as a successful wedding venue.

In 2022 the biggest changes took place within the Management team and Leo Morris became Director and Chief Operating Officer with a desire to take the family estate into a sustainable long term future.

Garden 

The garden features statues, sculptures, towers, tunnels, a labyrinth (with revolving floor), a  conifer dog's head, a  oak green man, water fountains, as well as grottoes. It also has a cafe and gift shop.

It is set out as a maze, and visitors are given a checklist of things to find on their visit. A brass rubbing sheet is also available to complete which 15 plaques hidden around the attraction.

The garden was voted the best European folly of the 20th century by the Folly Fellowship and best children's attraction in Yorkshire. It was rated as one of the top 10 follies by Huffington Post. Admission is by tickets pre-purchased online or pre-booked from an office in Middleham.  As of 2018 the price for Adults is £12.50, Seniors £11.50, Children £10.50 and a Family (2 adults and 2 children) £44.

References

Amusement parks in England
Tourist attractions in North Yorkshire
Folly buildings in England
Gardens in North Yorkshire
Coverdale (dale)